Virbia esula is a moth in the family Erebidae. It was described by Herbert Druce in 1889. It is found in Mexico.

References

Moths described in 1889
esula